"Learn to Let Go" is a song recorded by the American singer-songwriter Kesha. It appears on her third studio album, Rainbow (2017). It was released as the second promotional single from the album on July 28, 2017. Digital remixes were released worldwide on November 10, 2017.

Composition
Kesha was inspired to write "Learn to Let Go" by one of her friends who went through "the worst childhood imaginable." The track was the first to be written for the album and was also based on Kesha's struggles while making Rainbow.
About the song, Kesha told HuffPost:

	
She has also described the song's title as "one of my mantras over the last few years."

Music video
The music video for "Learn to Let Go" was released on July 27, 2017. In the video, Kesha shares home video footage of herself as a child, running in nature, singing and dancing wildly. The Costco bear appears in the video.

Live performances
The song was first performed live at the 2017 MTV Europe Music Awards on November 12. On November 14, Kesha performed the song live at the BBC Radio 1 Live Lounge, as well as a cover of Marshmello's song "Silence" featuring Khalid.

Kesha appeared on The Graham Norton Show to perform her song live, on November 24.

Commercial performance
Despite not being serviced as a single in North America, "Learn to Let Go" debuted at number 97 on the US Billboard Hot 100 issue dated August 8, 2017 as a promotional single. It also peaked at number 81 on the Canadian Hot 100.

Track listing
Digital download and streaming
 "Learn to Let Go" – 3:38

Digital download and streaming (the remixes)
 "Learn to Let Go" (Feenixpawl remix) – 3:22
 "Learn to Let Go" (Michael Brun remix) – 3:37

Charts

Release history

References

2017 songs
Kesha songs
Songs with feminist themes
Songs written by Kesha
Songs written by Stuart Crichton
Songs written by Pebe Sebert